John Peachey, 2nd Baron Selsey (16 March 1749 – 27 June 1816), styled The Honourable John Peachey between 1794 and 1808, was a British politician who sat in the House of Commons from 1776 to 1790.

Peachey was the son of James Peachey, 1st Baron Selsey, by Lady Georgiana Caroline Scott, daughter of Henry Scott, 1st Earl of Deloraine.

Peachey was returned to Parliament for St Germans in 1776, a seat he held until 1780, and then represented New Shoreham between 1780 and 1790.  In 1808 he entered the House of Lords on the death of his father.

Lord Selsey married Hester Elizabeth Jennings in 1784. They had four children:
 James Peachey (1783-1811)
 Captain Henry John Peachey RN (1787-1838)
 John William Peachey (1788-1837)
 Caroline Mary Vernon Harcourt (née Peachey)(1790-1871).

He died in June 1816, aged 67, and was succeeded by his eldest surviving son, Henry. Lady Selsey died in April 1837.

References

|-

1749 births
1816 deaths
2
Members of the Parliament of Great Britain for English constituencies
British MPs 1774–1780
British MPs 1780–1784
British MPs 1784–1790